Chitek Lake Anishinaabe Provincial Park is a provincial park designated by the Government of Manitoba in 2014. The park is considered to be a Class II protected area under the IUCN protected area management categories.

See also
List of protected areas of Manitoba
Skownan First Nation

References

External links
Manitoba Excellence in Sustainability Awards: 2015 Winners

Provincial parks of Manitoba
Protected areas of Manitoba